pcb-rnd is a modular and compact (core under 60k SLOC, plugins at 100k SLOC) software application used for layout design of electrical circuits. Pcb-rnd is used professionally as well as in universities. Pre-built packages are available on multiple operating systems. The software focuses on multiple file format support, scripting, multiple font support, a query language and command line support for batch processing and automation. The software provides user interfaces for command line, gtk2+gdk, gtk2+gl, gtk4+gl, and motif  supporting multiple GUIs with the same thing for every interface.

History

pcb-rnd was originally developed from a friendly fork of the geda PCB project. In 2020 pcb-rnd was funded through NGI0 PET as a part of the European Commission's Next Generation Internet program.

See also

 Comparison of EDA Software

References

Engineering software that uses GTK
Free software programmed in C
Free electronic design automation software
Electronic design automation software for Linux